Giovanni "Gio" Ponti ([d͡ʒo] 18 November 1891 – 16 September 1979) was an Italian architect, industrial designer, furniture designer, artist, teacher, writer and publisher.

During his career, which spanned six decades, Ponti built more than a hundred buildings in Italy and in the rest of the world. He designed a considerable number of decorative art and design objects as well as furniture. Thanks to the magazine Domus, which he founded in 1928 and directed almost all his life, and thanks to his active participation in exhibitions such as the Milan Triennial, he was also an enthusiastic advocate of an Italian-style art of living and a major player in the renewal of Italian design after the Second World War. From 1936 to 1961, he taught at the Milan Polytechnic School and trained several generations of designers. Ponti also contributed to the creation in 1954 of one of the most important design awards: the Compasso d'Oro prize. Ponti died on 16 September 1979.

His most famous works are the Pirelli Tower, built from 1956 to 1960 in Milan in collaboration with the engineer Pier Luigi Nervi, the Villa Planchart in Caracas and the Superleggera chair, produced by Cassina in 1957.

Early life and education
Ponti was born in Milan in 1891 to Enrico Ponti and Giovanna (Rigone). His studies were interrupted by his military service during World War I. He served as a Capitan in the Pontonier Corps (Corps of Engineers) from 1916 to 1918 and was awarded both the Bronze Medal of Military Valor and the Italian Military Cross.

Ponti graduated with a degree in architecture from the Politecnico di Milano University in 1921. The same year, he married Giulia Vimercati, with whom he had four children, Lisa, Giovanna, Letizia, and Giulio, and eight grandchildren.

Architecture and interior design

Ponti began his architectural career in partnership with Mino Fiocchi and Emilio Lancia from 1923 through 1927, and then through 1933 with Lancia only, as Studio Ponti e Lancia PL.  In these years he was influenced by and associated with the Milanese neoclassical Novecento Italiano movement. In 1925, Ponti participated in the International Exhibition of Modern Decorative and Industrial Arts in Paris, with the porcelain manufacturer. On this occasion, he made friends with Tony Bouilhet, director of the silversmith company Christofle. The family Bouilhet who entrusted him with his first architectural commission abroad, with the construction of the Ange Volant (1926–1928, in collaboration with Emilio Lancia and Tomaso Buzzi), a country house located on the edge of the Saint-Cloud golf course, on the outskirts of Paris. As he built his first building in Milan, via Randaccio (1925–1926), the Ange Volant was an opportunity for Ponti to experiment with his personal conception of the Italian-style house, the principles of which he gathered in his book La Casa all'Italiana published in 1933. Other outputs of the time include the 1928 Monument to the Fallen with the Novecento architects Giovanni Muzio, Tomaso Buzzi, Ottavio Cabiati, Emilio Lancia and Alberto Alpago Novello

The 1930s were years of intense activity for Ponti. He was involved in many projects, particularly in his native city of Milan. With the construction of the Borletti funeral chapel in 1931, he started to adopt a modernist shift. By removing all ornament, Ponti moved towards formal simplification where he sought to make style and structure coincide. The ten "case tipiche" (typical houses), built in Milan between 1931 and 1938, were also close to Rationalist Modernism while retaining features of Mediterranean houses like balconies, terraces, loggias and pergolas. Spacious, equipped and built with modern materials, they met the requirements of the new Milanese bourgeoisie. The construction of the Rasini building (1933–1936) with its flat roofs marked the end of his partnership with Emilio Lancia around 1933. He then joined forces with engineers Antonio Fornaroli and Eugenio Soncini to form Studio Ponti-Fornaroli-Soncini which lasted until 1945.

For the 1933 Fifth Triennial of Decorative Arts in Milan, Giovanni Muzio designed the Palazzo dell'Arte in Parco Sempione, a museum and theater to host the displays. Adjacent to the palace, a steel tower-spire was commissioned from Gio Ponti.
The  Littoria Tower (or Lictor's Tower, but now Branca Tower), was meant to resemble the bundles that formed the fasces. It was topped by a panoramic restaurant. Putatively the tower height was limited by Mussolini so as not to exceed the height of the Madonnina statue atop the Duomo. 

With the first office building of the Montecatini chemical group (1935–1938), for which he used the latest techniques and materials produced by the firm, in order to reflect the company's avant-garde spirit, Ponti designed, on an unprecedented scale (the offices housed 1,500 workstations), a building in every detail, from architecture to furniture.

Ponti is also involved in the project to expand the new university campus in Rome, led by the urban planner Marcello Piacentini by designing the School of Mathematics school, inaugurated in 1935. Ponti chose bright and functional spaces with simple lines, including a fan-shaped building that housed three amphitheaters. From 1934 to 1942, he worked at the University of Padua, with the construction and interior design of the new Faculty of Arts, Il Liviano (1934–1940), then the artistic direction and interior design of the Aula Magna, the basilica and the rectorate of the Palazzo Bo. In the late 1930s, Ponti deepened his research on Mediterranean housing by collaborating with writer and architect Bernard Rudofsky. Together, they imagined in 1938 the Albergo nel bosco on the island of Capri, a hotel designed as a village of house-bedrooms, all unique and scattered in the landscape.

At the turn of the 1940s, architectural projects continued initially for Ponti, with the construction of the Columbus Clinic (1939–1949) in Milan, and the interior design of the Palazzo del Bo at the University of Padua where he carried out a monumental fresco on the stairs leading to the rectorate. From 1943, due to the Second World War, his activity as an architect slowed down. This period corresponded to a period of reflection in which Ponti devoted himself to writing and designing sets and costumes for theatre and opera, such as Igor Stravinsky's Pulcinella for the Triennial Theatre in 1940, or Christoph Willibald Gluck's Orfeo ed Euridice for the Milan Scala in 1947. He also planned a film adaptation of Luigi Pirandello's Enrico IV for Louis Jouvet and Anton Giulio Bragaglia.

After World War 2, with the emergence of the Italian economic boom, the 1950s were a busy time for Ponti, who traveled abroad. He participated in the redevelopment and interior design of several Italian liners (Conte Grande et Conte Biancamano, 1949, Andrea Doria and Giulio Cesare, 1950, Oceania, 1951), showcases the know-how of his country. Construction continued in Milan. In 1952, he created a new agency with Antonio Fornaroli and his son-in-law Alberto Rosselli. This vast hangar was designed as an architecture laboratory, an exhibition space and a space for the presentation of studies and models.  After the death of Rosselli, he continued to work with his longtime partner Fornaroli. A block away, in via Dezza, Ponti built a nine-story apartment building, which housed his family. From 1950 to 1955, he was also in charge of the urban planning project for the Harar-Dessiè social housing district in Milan with architects Luigi Figini and Gino Pollini. For this complex, he designed two buildings with highly colored profiles, one of which was designed in collaboration with the architect Gigi Gho. 

With the help of engineer Pier Luigi Nervi, a concrete specialist who advised him on the structure, he built with his studio and Arturo Danusso the Pirelli tower (1956–1960). Facing Milan's main station, this 31-story,  skyscraper housed the headquarters of Pirelli, a company specializing in tyres and rubber products. At the time of its inauguration, and for a few months, it was the tallest building in Europe. Together with the Galfa Tower by Melchiorre Bega (1956–1959) and the Velasca Tower (1955–1961) of the BBPR Group, this skyscraper changed Milan's landscape. From 1953 to 1957, he built the Hotel della Città et de la Ville and the Centro Studi Fondazione Livio e Maria Garzanti, in Forlì (Italy), by the assignment of Aldo Garzanti, a famous Italian publisher.

In the 1950s, and thanks to his role in the Domus Magazine, Ponti was internationally known and commissions were multiplying, with constructions in Venezuela, Sweden, Iraq and projects in Brazil. In New York City, he set up the Alitalia airline agency (1958) on Fifth Avenue and was entrusted with the construction of the 250-seat auditorium of the Time-Life building (1959). In Caracas, Ponti had freedom to accomplish one of his masterpieces: the Villa Planchart (1953–1957), a house designed as a work of art on the heights of the capital, immersed in a tropical garden. Conceived as large-scale abstract sculpture, it can be seen from the inside as an uninterrupted sequence of points of view where light and color prevail. Outside, the walls were like suspended screens that defined the space of the house. At night, a lighting system highlighted its contours. All the materials and the furniture, chosen or designed by Ponti, were shipped from Italy. The overall effect has been noted for its "lightness": "the Villa Planchard sits so lightly on the hillside above Caracas that it is known as the 'butterfly house.'" A few miles away, Ponti designed for Blanca Arreaza, the Diamantina (1954–1956), so-called because of the diamond-shaped tiles that partially cover its facade. This villa has since been destroyed.

In the field of interior design, Ponti multiplied inventions and favoured multifunctional solutions; In 1951, he developed an ideal hotel room for the Milan Triennial, in which he presented a "dashboard" bed headboard composed of shelves, some of which were mobile, and control buttons for electricity or radio. He then applied this solution to domestic spaces and offices, with "organised walls". Next came the "fitted windows", for the manufacturer Altamira in particular and that he used for his apartment via Dezza. With its vertical and horizontal frames through which shelves, bookcases and frames can be arranged, the "fitted window" became the fourth transparent wall of a room and ensured a transition between the inside and the outside.

The 1960s and 1970s were dominated by international architectural projects in places like Tehran, Islamabad and Hong Kong, where Ponti developed new architectural solutions: the façades of his buildings became lighter and seemed to be detached like suspended screens. With the church of San Francesco al Fopponino in Milan (1961–1964), he created his first façade with perforated hexagonal openings. The sky and light became important protagonists of his architecture. This theatricality was reinforced by the omnipresence of ceramics, whose uses he reinvented both indoors and outdoors. In collaboration with the Milanese firm Ceramica Joo, he created diamond-shaped tiles with which he covered most of his facades (Villa Arreaza in Caracas, 1954–1956, Villa Nemazee in Tehran, 1957–1964, Shui Hing department store in Hong Kong, 1963, San Carlo Borromeo Hospital Church, 1964–1967 and Montedoria building, 1964–1970 in Milan). With Ceramica D'Agostino, he designed tiles with blue and white or green and white motifs that once combined create different more than a hundred motifs. They were used for the interior decoration of the hotels Parco dei Principi in Sorrento (1960) and in Rome (1961-1964). The Hotel Parco dei Principi in Sorrento was one of the first design hotel in Italy. Ponti also offered to Domus readers detailed plans of a circular house called Il scarabeo sotto la foglia (1964– The beetle under a leaf). This small oval building was covered with white and green ceramic tiles, both inside and outside, including the roof. Its envelope reflected the surrounding landscape and blended into it, like the shell of a beetle. In 1966, collector Giobatta Meneguzzo built his version of the beetle under a leaf in the province of Vicenza and entrusted the Italian designer Nanda Vigo for the interior design. With the Bijenkorf department store in Eindhoven in the Netherlands (1966–1969), Ponti proposed another solution, by creating a tiled façade for an existing building. Modular, it was enlivened thanks to the non-uniform arrangement of its openings with various shapes. Lit from behind, the facade turned into a bright screen at night. Facing the building, Ponti designed a living square where the inhabitants could meet and rest on sculptures built for this purpose. Ponti also deepened his reflection on the skyscraper with a project of triangular and coloured towers (1967–1969).

In the last years of his life, Ponti was more than ever in search of transparency and lightness. He saw his facades as folded and perforated sheets of paper with geometric shapes. The 1970s began with the inauguration in 1970 of the Taranto Cathedral, a white rectangular building topped with a huge concrete facade perforated with openings, such that it is referred to locally as "the sail." In 1971, he participated in the construction of the Denver Art Museum in Colorado, taking care of the building's exterior envelope. He also submitted in 1971 a project for the future Centre Georges-Pompidou in Paris by proposing to model an axis in the capital linking the Baltard pavilions in les Halles pavilions to the future modern art museum thanks to an art "garden".

Decorative arts and industrial design
In 1923, Ponti was appointed artistic director of Richard Ginori, one of Italy's leading porcelain manufacturers, based in Milan and Sesto Fiorentino, changing the company's whole output through the involvement of some of the main Italian artists of the time, including the sculptor Salvatore Saponaro.  He completely renewed the iconographic repertoire by freely revisiting the classical tradition. He also rationalized the production system of the pieces while maintaining their high quality of execution. The  pieces were presented at the first decorative arts biennial in Monza in 1923. With his new designs, he won the great prize for ceramics in 1925 at the International Exhibition of Modern Decorative and Industrial Arts in Paris. After this major success, Ponti played a major role in the modernisation of Italian decorative arts, especially thanks to his involvement in the Monza Biennials and the Milan Triennials. In the 1920s, Ponti began numerous collaborations, notably with the silverware company Christofle, the glassmakers Venini and Fontana Arte. He also founded the Labirinto group, with Tomaso Buzzi, Pietro Chiesa and Paolo Venini, among others. The Labirinto unique piece furniture was made of luxurious materials; at the same time, he designed Domus Nova with Emilio Lancia, a furniture collection with simple lines that was produced in series and sold by the Milanese department store La Rinascente.

In the 1930s, while Ponti continued to design unique pieces of furniture for specific interiors, and encouraged the promotion of quality series production. In 1930, he designed furniture and lighting for the glassmaker Fontana and became in 1933, together with Pietro Chiesa, the artistic director of the branch Fontana Arte. He created in particular a cylindrical lamp surrounded by crystal discs and mirrors and the famous Bilia Lamp.

In the 1940s and early 1950s, Ponti turned to unique creations showcasing the skills of exceptional craftsmen. With the artist and enameller Paolo De Poli, they created enamelled panels and brightly colored furniture. In 1956, they imagined an imaginary and colorful bestiary, light decorative objects such as cut and folded paper. Other collaborations were established, in particular with the Dal Monte brothers, who specialised in the production of papier-mâché objects, the ceramist Pietro Melandri, the porcelain manufacturer Richard Ginori and the Venini glass factory in Murano. From 1946 to 1950, he designed many objects for this glassmaker: bottles, chandeliers, including a multicoloured chandelier. The bottles evoke stylized female bodies. It was also in 1940 that he began working with the decorator and designer Piero Fornasetti. This fruitful collaboration, during which they designed furniture and many interiors where ornament and fantasy prevailed (Palazzo del Bo in Padua – 1940, Dulcioria pastry shop in Milan–1949, Sanremo casino – 1950, the liners Conte Grande – 1949 and Andrea Doria – 1950, etc.), spanned two decades.

At the turn of the 1950s, Ponti deployed a prolific creation where he sought to combine aesthetic and functional requirements: the espresso machine for La Pavoni in 1948 and the Visetta sewing machine for Visa (1949), textiles for JSA, door handles for Olivari, a range of sanitary facilities for Ideal Standard, cutlery for Krupp Italiana and Christofle, lighting for Arredoluce and furniture for the Swedish department store Nordiska Kompaniet. From its fruitful collaboration with Cassina, the Leggera and Superleggera (superlight) chairs, the Distex, Round, Lotus and Mariposa chairs are now among the classics of Italian design. In 1957, the Superleggera chair designed for Cassina, and still produced today, was put on the market. Starting from the traditional chair model, originating from the village of Chiavari in Liguria, Ponti eliminated all unnecessary weight and material and assimilated the shape as much as possible to the structure, in order to obtain a modern silhouette weighing only 1.7 kg. the chair, which was very strong but also so light that it can be lifted by a child using just one finger. Some of his furniture is now being reissued by Molteni&C. In the United States, he participated in the exhibition Italy at Work at the Brooklyn Museum in 1950, and created furniture for Singer & Sons, Altamira, and cutlery for Reed & Barton ("Diamond" flatware, 1958), adapted for production by designer Robert H. Ramp).

Many models also emerged in the 1960s, such as the Continuum rattan armchair for Pierantonio Bonacina (1963), wooden armchairs for Knoll International (1964), the Dezza armchair for Poltrona Frau (1966), a sofa bed for Arflex, the Novedra armchair for C&B (1968) or the Triposto stool for Tecno (1968). He invented lighting fixtures for Fontana Arte, Artemide (1967), Lumi (1960), and Guzzini (1967), but also fabrics for JSA and a dinner service for Ceramica Franco Pozzi (1967).

In 1970, Ponti presented his concept of an adapted house (casa adatta) at Eurodomus 3 in Milan, where the house is centred around a spacious room with sliding partitions, around which the rooms and service areas gravitate. The space requirement for furniture and services was reduced to a minimum. The furniture also became flexible and space-saving in order to optimise space. The Gabriela chair (1971) with a reduced seat, as well as the Apta furniture series (1970) for Walter Ponti, illustrated this new way of life.

Ponti continued to create wall and floor coverings whose graphic rendering becomes a work of art in itself. Foliage patterns were developed on tiles for Ceramica D'Agostino. Together with this manufacturer, he also produced geometrically decorated and coloured tiles to cover the floors of the Salzburger Nachrichten newspaper's headquarters in Salzburg in 1976. A similar process was used in 1978 to cover the facade of the Shui Hing department store in Singapore. Finally, that same year, his ultimate decorative and poetic shapes, a bestiary of folded silver leaves, were interpreted by the silversmith Lino Sabattini. Ponti died on 16 September 1979.

Creative advocacy and activity 
From the beginning of his career, Ponti promoted Italian creation in all its aspects. In a 1940 publication, he wrote that: "The Italians were born to build. Building is a characteristic of their race, it informs their mentality, commitment to their work and destiny, it is the expression of their existence, and the supreme and immortal mark of their history."

From a simple participant, he became a member of the steering committee of the Monza Biennials in 1927, where he advocated for a closer bond between crafts and industry. Thanks to his involvement, the Biennale underwent tremendous development: renamed the Triennial of Art and Modern Architecture in 1930 and relocated to Milan in 1933, it became a privileged place to observe innovation at the international level.

Within the new multidisciplinary review of art, architecture and interior design Domus, which he founded in 1928 with the publisher Gianni Mazzochi and which he directed almost all his life, Ponti had the opportunity to spread his ideas. The aim of this review was to document all forms of artistic expression in order to stimulate creation through an independent critical perspective. A mirror of the architectural and decorative arts trends, it introduced Italian readers to the modernist movement and creators such as Le Corbusier, Ludwig Mies van der Rohe, Jean-Michel Frank and Marcel Breuer. Ponti also presented the work of Charles Eames and of the decorator Piero Fornasetti. Over the years, the magazine became more international and played an important role in the evolution of Italian and international design and architecture. Still published today, Domus is a reference in the fields of architecture and design.

In 1941 Ponti resigned as editor of Domus and set up Stile magazine—an architecture and design magazine sympathetic to the fascist regime—which he edited until 1947. In the magazine, which expressed clear support for fascist Italy and Nazi Germany, in reference to the regime, Ponti wrote: "our great allies give us an example of tenacious, very serious, organized and orderly application "(Stile, August 1941). Stile only lasted a few years and shut-down after the Aglo-American liberation of Italy and the defeat of The Rome-Berlin Axis.

In 1948 he returned to Domus, where he remained as editor until his death. His daughter Lisa Licitra Ponti soon joined the editorial team. In the 1950s, the review became more international and the reopening of borders encouraged confrontation with different cultural and visual worlds. Thanks to his involvement in numerous exhibitions, Ponti established himself as a major player in the development of post-war design and the diffusion of "Made in Italy".

In 1957, Ponti published Amate l'architettura (In Praise of Architecture), his seminal work where he defined the expression of a finished form (la forma finita) that was simple, light, and did not allow any possibility of extension, addition, repetition or superposition. This concept applied to architecture as well as art and design. It was symbolized by the hexagonal shape of the diamond that Ponti used in many of his creations.

In the 1950s and in the 1960s, Ponti multiplied events in Italy and abroad. In 1964, he organised a series of exhibitions in the Ideal Standard showroom in Milan, named "Espressioni", featuring a generation of talents such as Achille and Pier Giacomo Castiglioni, Enzo Mari, Bruno Munari, Ettore Sottsass,  or the artists Lucio Fontana and Michelangelo Pistoletto. It was also in the mid 1960s that he befriended art critic Pierre Restany, who became a regular contributor to the Domus magazine. Ponti also coordinated the Italian and European editions of the Eurodomus design exhibitions, including the exhibition "Formes italiennes" in 1967 at the Galeries Lafayette in Paris. At Eurodomus 2 in Turin in 1968, Ponti presented a model of a city, Autilia, for which he imagined a continuous vehicle circulation system. The art historian Nathan Shapira, his student and disciple, organised that same year, with the help of Ponti, his first retrospective exhibition which travelled the United States for two years.

From 1936 to 1961 he worked as a professor on the permanent staff of the Faculty of Architecture at Politecnico di Milano University.

Awards
In 1934 he was given the title of "Commander" of the Royal Order of Vasa in Stockholm. He also obtained the Accademia d'Italia Art Prize for his artistic merits, as well as a gold medal from the Paris Académie d'Architecture. Finally, he obtained an honorary doctorate from the London Royal College of Art.

Selected works and projects

Architecture and interior design 

 1924–1926: via Randaccio building, Milan, Italy
 1926–1928: country house l'Ange volant, Paris Region, France
 1928: Borletti building, via San Vittore, Milan, Italy
 1928–1930: Via Domenichino building, Milan, Italy (interior design and furnishing of the Vimercati apartment in the building)
 1931: Borletti funerary chapel, Milan, Italy
 1931–1932: Interior design of the restaurant Ferrario, Milan stock exchange, Palazzo Mezzanotte, piazza degli affari, Milan, Italy
 1931–1936: Case tipiche (typical houses), via de Togni, Milan, Italy (1931–1934, Domus Julia; 1932–1934, Domus Fausta; 1932–1936, Domus Carola)
 1932–1935: School of Mathematics, University campus la Sapienza, Rome, Italy
 1932–1936: ItalCima chocolate factory, via Crespi, Milan, Italy
 1933: Littoria tower (today the Branca tower), Milan, Italy
 1933–1936: Rasini building, bastioni di Porta Venezia, Milan, Italy
 1933–1938: Case tipiche (typical houses), via Letizia and via del Caravaggio, Milan, Italy (1933–1936, Domus Serena; 1933–1937, Domus Livia, Domus Aurelia, Domus Honoria; 1938, Domus Flavia)
 1934: De Bartolomeis villas, Val Seriana, Italy
 1934: Room "Più leggero dell'aria" ("Lighter than air") at the Esposizione dell’aeronautica italiana, Palazzo dell'Arte, Milan, Italy
 1934–1935: Domus Adele (Magnaghi and Bassanini building), viale Zugna, Milan, Italy
 1934–1940: Faculty of the Arts, Il Liviano, University of Padua, piazza del Capitanato, Padua, Italy
 1935–1936: Laporte house, via Benedetto Brin, Milan, Italy
 1935–1936: Interior design and furnishing of the Italian cultural institute, Lützow-Fürstenberg Palace, Vienna, Austria
 1935–1937: Paradiso del Cevedale hotel, Val Martello, Bolzano, Italy
 1935–1938: First Montecatini building, via Turati, Milan, Italy
 1936: Design of the universal exhibition of the catholic press, Vatican, Italy
 1936–1938: Domus Alba, via Goldoni, Milan, Italy
 1936–1942: Ferrania building (today Fiat), corso Matteotti, Milan, Italy
 1936–1942: Artistic direction and interior design of the Aula Magna, basilica and administrative building of Palazzo del Bo, University of Padua, Padua, Italy
 1938: San Michele hotel, Capri, Italy (project)
 1938: Design of the "Mostra della Vittoria", Fiera di Padova, Padua, Italy
 1938–1949: Columbus clinic, via Buonarroti, Milan, Italy
 1939: Competition for the Palazzo dell'Acqua e della Luce ("Palace of Water and Light") for the E42, Rome, Italy (project)
 1939–1952: Piazza San Babila building, Milan, Italy
 1939–1952: RAI headquarters(ex-EIAR), corso Sempione, Milan, Italy
 1947–1951: Second Montecatini building, largo Donegani, Milan, Italy
 1949: Interior design of the ocean liners Conte Biancamano and Conte Grande for Società di Navigazione Italia, Genoa, Italy
 1950: Interior design of the ocean liners Andrea Doria and Giulio Cesare for Società di Navigazione, Gruppo IRI-Finmare, Genoa, Italy
 1950–1955: Urban planning and buildings for Ina, Harrar-Dessiè neighborhood, Milan, Italy
 1951: Competition for the interior design of the ocean liners Asia and Vittoria (project)
 1951: Interior design of the ocean liner Oceania for Lloyd Triestino, Trieste, Italy
 1952: Architecture studio Ponti-Fornaroli-Rosselli, via Dezza, Milan, Italy
 1952: Interior design of the ocean liner Africa for Lloyd Triestino, Trieste, Italy
 1952: Interior design of the Casa di Fantasia, Piazza Piemonte, Milan, Italy
 1952–1958: Italian cultural institute, Carlo Maurillo Lerici Foundation, Stockholm, Sweden
 1953: Italian-Brazilian-Centre, Predio d'Italia, São Paulo, Brazil (project)
 1953: Institute of nuclear physics, São Paulo, Brazil (project)
 1953: Villa Taglianetti, São Paulo, Brazil (project)
 1953–1957: Villa Planchart, Caracas, Venezuela
 1954–1956: Villa Arreaza, Caracas, Venezuela
 1955–1960: San Luca Evangelista church, via Vallazze, Milan, Italy
 1956–1957: Building, via Dezza, Milan, Italy
 1956–1960: Pirelli tower, piazza Duca d'Aosta, Milan, Italy
 1956–1962: Development board, Baghdad, Iraq
 1957–1959: Carmelite convent, Bonmoschetto, Sanremo, Italy
 1957–1964: Villa Nemazee (fa), Tehran, Iran
 1958: Interior design of the Alitalia agency, Fifth Avenue, New York City, United States
 1958–1962: RAS office building, via Santa Sofia, Milan, Italy
 1959: Auditorium of the Time-Life Building, Sixth Avenue, New York City, United States
 1960: Parco dei Principi hotel, Sorrento, Italy
 1961: Design of the Mostra internazionale del lavoro, Italia'61, Turin, Italy
 1961–1963: Facade of the Shui Hing department store, Nathan Road, Hong Kong
 1961–1964: Parco dei Principi hotel, via Mercadante, Rome, Italy
 1961–1964: San Francesco al Fopponino church, via Paolo Giovio, Milan, Italy
 1962: Pakistan House hotel, Islamabad, Pakistan
 1962–1964: Ministerial buildings, Islamabad, Pakistan
 1963: Villa for Daniel Koo, Hong Kong
 1964: Scarabeo sotto una foglia (Beetle under a leaf), villa Anguissola, Lido di Camaiore, Massa Carrara, Italy
 1964–1967: San Carlo Borromeo hospital church, via San Giusto, Milan, Italy
 1964–1970: Montedoria building, via Pergolesi, Milan, Italy
 1964–1970: Cathedral, Taranto, Italy
 1966: Canopy for the main basilica at the Oropa sanctuary, Biella, Italy
 1966–1969: Facade of De Bijenkorf department store, Eindhoven, Netherlands
 1967–1969: Colourful and triangular skyscrapers (project)
 1970–1972: Denver Art Museum, Denver, Colorado, United States
 1971: Competition for the Plateau Beaubourg, Paris, France (project)
 1974: Facade for the Mony Konf building, Hong Kong
 1976: Tile floors for the headquarters of the Salzburger Nachtrichten newspaper, Salzburg, Austria
 1977–1978: Facade of the Shui Hing department store, Singapore

Decorative arts and design 

 1923–1938: Ceramics and porcelain for Richard Ginori, Doccia factory in Sesto Fiorentino, and San Cristoforo factory in Milan, Italy
 1927: pewter and silver objects for Christofle, Paris, France
 1927–1930: creation of two furniture collections, Il Labirinto and Domus Nova, Milan, Italy
 1930: Furniture and objets for Fontana Arte, Milan, Italy Beginning of partnership with Fontana Arte.
 1930–1933: Textiles for Vittorio Ferrari, Milan, Italy
 1930–1936: Cutlery for Krupp Italiana, Milan, Italy
 1940: Paintings and objects made from enamel on copper in collaboration with Paolo De Poli, Padua, Italy
 1940: Sets and costumes for Pulcinella by Igor Stravinsky, Teatro dell'Arte, Milan, Italy
 1940–1959: furniture and interior design in partnership with Piero Fornasetti
 1941–1947: Furniture decorated with enamel in collaboration with Paolo De Poli, Padua, Italy
 1942–1943: Film adaptation of the play Henry IV by Luigi Pirandello (project)
 1944: Sets and costumes for the ballet Festa Romantica by Giuseppe Piccioli, la Scala, Milan, Italy
 1945: Furniture for Saffa, "La casa entro l'armadio" (the house in the wardrobe), Milan, Italy
 1945: Sets and costumes for the ballet Mondo Tondo by Ennio Porrino, la Scala, Milan, Italy
 1946: Objects in papier-mâché in collaboration with Enrico and Gaetano Dal Monte, Faenza, Italy
 1946–1950: Glass objects for Venini, Murano, Venice, Italy
 1947: Sets and costumes for Orfeo ed Euridice by Christoph Willibald Gluck, la Scala, Milan, Italy
 1948: Coffee machine La Cornuta for La Pavoni, Milan, Italy
 1949: Sewing machine Visetta for Visa, Voghera, Italy
 1950: Furniture for Singer & Sons, New York City, United States
 1950–1960: Textiles for Jsa, Busto Arsizio, Varese, Italy
 1951: Display of a standard hotel room for the IXth Milan Triennial, Milan, Italy
 1951: 646 Leggera chair for Cassina, Meda, Milan, Italy
 1951: Conca cutlery and other silver objects for Krupp Italiana, Milan, Italy
 1953: Furniture and organized walls for Altamira, New York City, United States
 1953: Furniture for Nordiska Kompaniet department store, Stockholm, Sweden
 1953: 807 Distex armchair for Cassina, Meda, Milan, Italy
 1953: Bathroom fittings for Ideal Standard, Milan, Italy
 1953: Bodywork line Diamante for Carrozzeria Touring, Milan, Italy (project)
 1953: Sets and costumes for Mitridate Eupatore by Alessandro Scarlatti, Milan, Italy
 1953–1954: Folding chair for Cassina-Singer, Milan, Italy, later produced by Reguitti, Brescia, Italy
 1954–1958: Diamante cutlery for Reed & Barton, Newport, Massachusetts, United States
 1956: Round armchair for Cassina, Meda, Milan, Italy
 1956: Door handles for Olivari, Borgomanero, Novara, Italy
 1956: Light fittings for Arredoluce, Milan, Italy
 1956: Enameled cooper objects and animals in collaboration with Paolo De Poli, Padua, Italy
 1956–1957: Diamond-shaped tiles and ceramic pebbles for Ceramica Joo, Limito, Milan, Italy
 1957: 699 Superleggera chair for Cassina, Meda, Milan, Italy
 1959: Folding chair for Reguitti, Milan, Italy
 1960: Wall light for Lumi, Milan, Italy
 1960–1964: Tiling for Ceramica d'Agostino, Salerno, Italy
 1963: Continuum armchair for Pierantonio Bonacina, Lurago d'Erba, Como, Italy
 1964: Seat for Knoll International, Milan, Italy
 1966: Dezza armchairs and divans for Poltrona Frau, Tolentino, Italy
 1966: Bathroom fittings for Ideal Standard, Milan, Italy
 1967: The Los Angeles Cathedral, sculpture
 1967: Polsino lamp for Guzzini, Macerata, Italy
 1967: Fato lamp for Artemide, Milan, Italy
 1967: Tableware for Ceramica Franco Pozzi, Gallarate, Italy
 1968: Novedra armchair for C&B Italia, Novedrate, Italy
 1968: Triposto furniture for Tecno, Varedo, Italy
 1970: Apta furniture for Walter Ponti, San Biagio, Mantua, Italy
 1970: Textiles for Jsa, Busto Arsizio, Varese, Italy
 1971: Gabriela chair for Walter Ponti, San Biagio, Mantua, Italy, later produced by Pallucco, Preganziol, Treviso, Italy
 1971: Household linen for Zucchi, Milan, Italy
 1973: Lamps for Reggiani, Milan, Italy
 1973–1975: Tiling for Ceramica d'Agostino, Salerno, Italy
 1978: Objects made from silver leaf in collaboration with Lino Sabattini, Bregnano, Como, Italy

References

 
 
 

La Pietra, Ugo, Gio Ponti, New York: Rizzoli International, 1996
Licitra Ponti, Lisa, Gio Ponti, The Complete Work, 1928–1978, Cambridge (Mass.): MIT Press, 1990
Fabrizio Mautone, Gio Ponti. La committenza Fernandes, Electa Napoli, 2009, 
Gio Ponti, In Praise of Architecture, NY: F.W. Dodge Corporation, 1960. Library of Congress number 59-11727
 Graziella Roccella, Gio Ponti: Master of Lightness, Cologne: Taschen, 2009, 
 Marco Romanelli, Licitra Ponti, Lisa (ed.), Gio Ponti. A World, Milan: Abitare Segesta, 2003
 Daniel Sherer, "Gio Ponti: The Architectonics of Design," Catalogue Essay for Retrospective Gio Ponti: A Metaphysical World, Queens Museum of Art,  curated by Brian Kish, 15 Feb – 20 May 2001, 1–6.
 Daniel Sherer, "Gio Ponti in New York: Design, Architecture, and the Strategy of Synthesis," in Espressioni di Gio Ponti, ed. G. Celant. Catalogue essay for the Ponti Exhibition at the Triennale di Milano, 6 May – 24 July 2011 (Milan: Electa, 2011), 35–45.
 Mario Universo, Gio Ponti designer: Padova, 1936–1941, Rome: Laterza, 1989

Citations

External links

Gio Ponti's works on the  Italian public Television – RAI
Gio Ponti Archives – Official Website
 INA Casa Harrar-Ponti by Gio Ponti in Rome (1951–1955) (with drawings and photos)
 Gio Ponti's inventions on Architonic 

1891 births
1979 deaths
20th-century Italian architects
Italian fascist architecture
Modernist architects
Modernist designers
Italian furniture designers
Italian designers
Italian military personnel of World War I
Italian industrial designers
Architects from Milan
Polytechnic University of Milan alumni
Academic staff of the Polytechnic University of Milan
Commanders of the Order of Vasa
Modernist architects from Italy
Italian magazine editors
Italian magazine founders
Compasso d'Oro Award recipients
Domus (magazine) editors